Live at the Key Club may refer to:

 Live @ the Key Club, a 2000 album by Pennywise
 Live at the Key Club (Cinderella album)
 The Sting: Live at the Key Club L.A.